Spirit of the United Neretva Robotics (Serbo-Croatian: Duh Ujedinjenih Neretve) or SUN Robotics is a FIRST team founded in December 2009 by the high school United World College in Mostar, Bosnia and Herzegovina. In the months of January and February 2010, four other schools of the city joined the team.

The team
The team is subdivided in a variety of other small teams according to their scope: Design, Building, Electronics, Programming, Web site.
The president of the team is Valentina Mindoljevic, headmaster of the United World College in Mostar, who created first the team with the captain Ingrid Fiedler at the end of the year 2009.

2010 competition

Breakaway is the game for the 2010 FIRST Robotics Competition. Robots are supposed to play a game like football. Their main purpose is to shoot footballs into goals. However the field looks a bit different. Bumps, tunnels and towers are placed on the field and make the game more interesting.

The day of the qualifications at the Israeli regional competition the wireless networks linking the controller to the robots in competition had interference problems, so the qualification matches played by the team had to be moved to the next day and thus were halved by nine games per team to four/five games. However, this unsuccessful day was a great opportunity for the SUN's members to get into the competition's atmosphere and do better the day after.

The team's members have been hosted by FIRST Team 1937, which was of great support during the whole competition.

The second day of the competition the Team won only one game out of three. In the first two games the team showed up having a great defense, but the alliance's robots did not work properly because of the misfunctioning wireless connection. During the third game the team decided to move up in the field and scored three times in a row.
The team won the Rookie Inspiration Award  due to their passion for the game and their spirit.

2011 competition

Achievements

Regional

Israel Competition
Rookie Inspiration Award (1): 2010

Championship

FIRST Championship
Dean's List, Ingrid Fiedler: 2010

Sponsors 
2010: BAE Systems, United World Colleges

2011: United World Colleges

References

FIRST Robotics Competition teams